Berliz Susan Carrizo Escandela is a beauty pageant titleholder, born in Lagunillas, Zulia, Venezuela on April 24, 1984. She was the official representative of Venezuela at the Miss World 2005 pageant held in  Sanya, China on December 1, 2005. Earlier, she has also won the Best Smile award.

Carrizo also represented her country in the Miss Italia Nel Mondo 2008 beauty pageant, held in Jesolo, Italy on June 23, 2008, when she classified in the Top 25 semifinalists.

References

External links
Miss Venezuela Official Website
Miss World Official Website
Miss Italia Nel Mondo Official Website

1984 births
Living people
People from Zulia
Venezuelan female models
Miss Venezuela World winners
Miss World 2005 delegates
Venezuelan people of Italian descent
University of Zulia alumni